Great Court is the main court of Trinity College, Cambridge, and reputed to be the largest enclosed courtyard in Europe.

The court was completed by Thomas Nevile, master of the college, in the early years of the 17th century, when he rearranged the existing buildings to form a single court.

Description

Starting in the northeast corner at E staircase, in which Isaac Newton had his rooms, and moving clockwise, one first reaches the Porters' Lodge and Great Gate, begun in 1490 as the entrance to King's Hall and completed in 1535.  The Great Gate holds the famous statue of Henry VIII whose sceptre was replaced by a chair leg by students in the 19th century. Next comes the East Range, and staircases F-K (with J omitted) that contain the college bursary and rooms principally housing fellows of the college. Staircase I leads to Angel Court, containing rooms for students and fellows, and to the college bar.

The South Range runs from staircases L–Q with rooms for students and fellows, with Queen's Gate (named after Elizabeth I of England) as its centrepiece. R staircase can be found in a passage leading to Bishop's Hostel, while S staircase is on the left in the passage leading past the Hall into Nevile's Court.  The West Range is dominated by the Great Hall, the college's dining hall modelled on that of Middle Temple, and the Master's Lodge.

The fourth side begins with staircases A–C, before reaching King's Gate (also called Edward III Gateway), and the entrance to the oldest part of the college, the remaining surviving buildings of King's Hall. Originally built on the site of the current sundial in the middle of the court, Nevile moved it 20 metres north when completing the court. King's Gate also houses the famous Trinity College Clock that chimes every 15 minutes and strikes the hour twice. The clock was installed at the request of Master of Trinity Richard Bentley in the 17th century, striking each hour once for the college of his mastership, Trinity, and once for his alma mater, St John's College, Cambridge.

In the centre of the court is an ornate fountain, built during Nevile's time, and fed by a pipe from Conduit Head in west Cambridge.

The Great Court Run

Many have tried to run the 339 metres (371 yards) around the court in the time it takes to strike 12 o'clock (actually 24 chimes owing to an old tradition), a feat recreated in the 1981 film Chariots of Fire (though filmed in Eton College, not Trinity).

Known as the Great Court Run, students traditionally attempt to complete the circuit on the day of the Matriculation Dinner. Only two people are believed to have actually completed the run in the time, the first being Lord Burghley in 1927. Contrary to the depiction in Chariots of Fire, Harold Abrahams never attempted the Run.

Sebastian Coe and Steve Cram attempted the feat in a charity race on 29 October 1988. Coe's time was reported by Norris McWhirter to have been 45.52 seconds, but it was actually 46.0 seconds as confirmed by the video tape, while Cram's was 46.3 seconds. The clock on that day took 44.4 seconds and video confirms that Coe was approximately 12 metres short of his finish line when the fateful final stroke occurred. There is some debate over the dying sounds of the bell being included in the striking time, which would allow Coe's run to be claimed as successful. The event was organized by 36-year-old undergraduate Nigel McCrery and raised £50,000 for the Great Ormond Street Hospital for Children.

In 2007, Sam Dobin was seen to 'beat' the clock in a time of 42.77s, improving on his 3rd-place finish the previous year. Dobin's achievement received national newspaper coverage which reported it as the fastest time in the history of the race, beating Burghley and Coe's efforts.

From 2012 to 2014, Cornelius Roemer won the run three times in a row, and beat the clock in his 2014 run.

However, the route taken by competitors around the court has changed over the years, thus making the accomplishment much more attainable. The current route—running on the cobbles rather than the path—cuts the distance down to 297m (the perimeter of the grass) as opposed to 339m (the perimeter of the cobbles). This is about 19% shorter, reducing the pace required from Olympic to a level manageable by hundreds of good club athletes across the country, and enables the four sharp corners to be "rounded off" so that runners do not need to slow down appreciably when taking the corners.

As of 2017, competitors taking part in the "serious" run (a "fun" run is held simultaneously) have been barred from running on the cobbles under penalty of disqualification.

Recent winners:
2000: Adrian Hemery
2001: Mike Collins
2002: Huw Watson (AUS)
2003: Calum T.M. Nicholson
2005: Chris Wilson
2006: Dany Gammall
2007: Sam Dobin (beat the clock on the cobbles route)
2008: Edgar Engel
2009: Cancelled due to poor weather conditions
2010: Henry Husband
2011: Steven Karp (CAN)
2012: Cornelius Roemer
2013: Cornelius Roemer 
2014: Cornelius Roemer (beat the clock on the cobbles route)
2015: Jiri Kucera (CZE)
2016: Patrick Bradbury
2019: George Mears (beat the clock)

The 2009 event was cancelled due to poor weather leaving the court unsafe to run on.

David Cecil, the only man to achieve the Great Court Run prior to 2007, and Sebastian Coe, the man who came closest to achieving the feat between Cecil's and Dobin's successes, both achieved the distinctions of Olympic Champion, Member of both Houses of Parliament, and Chairman of the London Olympics Organising Committee (David Cecil at the 1948 Olympics, Sebastian Coe at the 2012 Olympics).

 Other factors affect the timing of the Great Court Run. The speed at which the bells strike is governed by a mechanical fly, details of which are recorded by The Trinity Clock Monitoring Project. The fly uses air resistance to govern the speed at which the striking mechanism turns and as such the speed depends most importantly on the density of the air. The duration of the striking of twelve thus depends on the meteorological conditions of the day in question. On a cold, dry, high-pressure day the bells strike more slowly than on a warm, humid low-pressure day. This can cause variation of as much as 2 seconds either side of the normal time of around 48 seconds.  For typical October days (the official run takes place in October) the likely difference is a more modest one second.  Runners in midwinter will have the best chance of completing the circuit before the bells have finished. The best weather conditions for completing the run is on a cold dry day on account of air density which depends on temperature, barometric pressure and humidity.    The chime speed is also affected by the number of days since the chimes were last wound, three being optimal.  This is because the cable for weight driving the bells runs onto a second layer of the winding drum, as has been measured by the Keeper of the Clock.  There is also the effect of the weight of the cable itself so that the bells speed up a little as the weights descend over the period of a week (being the time between windings).  Both these effects can be seen in the diagrams showing variation of the strike duration with the number of days after winding.

Caucus Race 
A less structured event, the Caucus Race, occurs during the summer long vacation when undergraduates who have summer courses gather all around Great Court just before two o'clock dressed in their academic robes. Great Court is divided into six rectangular lawns and the objective of the race is to circumnavigate all six individually and in all their combinations, which requires a mathematical brain to plan well, and end at the fountain. The entry fee is a pint of beer. As soon as the clock starts to strike everyone starts running around whatever route they have chosen, much to the consternation of the tourists. On reaching the fountain everyone gets a prize of a pint of beer. It has been done in 14 minutes but that is exceptional.

The chapel

The final part of the court is completed by the chapel, begun by Mary I in 1554 in memory of her father. The ante-chapel contains statues of many famous Trinity men, including Roubiliac's sculpture of Isaac Newton, Thomas Woolner's piece of William Whewell and the altarpiece is Benjamin West's St Michael and the Devil.

The chapel contains a fine organ built by the Swiss firm of Metzler in 1975—one of only two instruments by this respected maker in Great Britain. It is contained within the restored late seventeenth-century case built by perhaps England's most famous organ builder "Father" Smith. The Metzler organ incorporates some surviving pipes from this instrument.

Dimensions
The exact external dimensions of the four sides of Great Court are:
 South – 87.8m (82.5m)
 West – 105.2m (99.9m)
 North – 78.3m (69.4m)
 East – 99.4m (88.9m)
which enclose an area of approximately 1.8 acres (7,300 square metres). (The figures given in parentheses are the distances run on the flagstones for the Great Court Run)

References

External links
 Panorama of the Great Court
 Great Court Run

Great Court
Buildings and structures in Cambridge
Parks and open spaces in Cambridge
Courtyards

Sport at the University of Cambridge